Behind the column with the Dancers of Delphi was situated the Athenian Treasury, where was located the famous ex voto of Daochos, a long marble base where stood nine statues, eight of which represented members of Daochos' family and one a god, probably Apollo. Daochos II, son of Agias, a politician from Pharsalus and supporter of Macedonia, was a hieromnemon at the delphic sanctuary from 336 to 332 B.C. He dedicated the ex voto as a sign of honour to his prominent family.

Description

The ex voto of Daochos was the sculpted ex voto of the tetrarch of Thessaly Daochos II to  the god  Apollo, which had been placed in the Treasury of the Thessalians to the northeast of the temple of Apollo in Delphi. The ex voto dates probably between 339 and 334 B.C., in the time when Daochos II was hieromnemon of Pharsalus in the Delphic Amphictyony. Other dates have, however, been proposed.
Initially it was thought that the ex voto stood free. However, recent studies concluded that the monument was probably situated within the Treasury of the Thessalians, built around 361 B.C. by Agelaus. The ex voto had the form of a sculpted complex comprising nine figures: eight members of the family of Daochos and one of a god, possibly of Apollo. All figures were accompanied by inscriptions which facilitated their identification. Only the god's figure does not bear an inscription. The figures presented are those of Acnonius, Agias, Telemachus, Agelaus, Daochus I, Sisyphus I, Daochus II and Sisyphus II. The presence of Agias in this group led the scholars to attribute the entire complex to the workshop of Lysippus, as the latter had created a statue of the Thessalian leader in Pharsalus.

Position I 
The statues were found fragmented during the Great Excavations, in 1894.  In Position I stood the statue of Apollo, as established by Prof. E. Will. The god was apparently depicted seated and holding the lyre.

Position II
In Position II stood Acnonius, as attested by the inscription: Ἀκνόνιος Ἀπάρου τέτραρχος Θεσσαλῶν. Acnonius was the great ancestor of the house of Daochos.

Position III
In position III was found the inscription:
Πρῶτος Ὀλύμπια παγκράτιον, Φαρσάλιε νίκᾳς,
Ἁγία Ἀκνονίου, γῆς ἀπὸ Θεσσαλίας,
Πεντάκις ἐν Νεμέᾳ, τρὶς Πύθια, πεντάκις Ἰσθμοῖ
καὶ σῶν οὐδείς πω στῆσε τρόπαια χερῶν.
It referred to Agias, son of Acnonius, who had won at the pankration in three Panhellenic Games. The statue is attributed to Lysippus.

Position IV 
In position IV one reads the inscription:
Κἀγὼ τοῦδε ὁμάδελφο[ς ἔ]φυν, ἀριθμὸν δὲ τὸν αὐτὸν
ἤμασι τοῖς αὐτοῖς ἐχφ[έρ]ομαι στεφάνων
νικῶν μουνοπάλ[ης], Τ[υρ]σηνῶν δὲ ἄνδρα κρατίστον
κτεῖνα ἐθέλοντο[ς ἑοῦ Τ]ηλέμαχος δ’ ὄνομα.
It mentions the wrestler Telemachus, who was no inferior to Agias in victories.

Position V 
In position V the inscription runs:
Οἳδε μὲν ἀθλοφόρου ῥώμης ἴσον ἔσχον, ἐγὼ δε
σύγγονος ἀμφοτέρων τῶνδε Ἀγέλαος ἔφυν
νικῶ δὲ στάδιον τούτοις ἃμα Πύθια παῖδας
μοῦνοι δὲ θνητῶν τούσδ’ ἔχομεν στεφάνους.
It refers to Agelaus, the younger brother, who had won at the children's race at the Pythian Games.

Position VI 
Position VI was dedicated to Daochos I, son of Agias, who governed Thessaly for 27 years, offering Thessaly a period of flourishment. This is attested by the inscription:
Δάοχος Ἁγία εἰμί, πατρὶς Φάρσαλος ἁπάσης
Θεσσαλίας ἄρξας, οὐ βίᾳ ἀλλὰ νόμῳ
ἑπτὰ καὶ εἴκοσι ἔτη, πολλῇ δὲ καὶ ἀγλαοκάρπῳ
εἰρήνη πλούτῳ τε ἔβρυε Θεσσαλία.

Position VII
In position VII runs the inscription:

Οὐκ  ἔψευσε σε Παλλὰς ἐν ὕπνῳ, Δαόχου υἱὲ
Σίσυφε, ἅ δ’ εἶπε σαφή θῆκεν ὑποσχεσίαν
ἐξ οὐ γὰρ τὸ πρῶτον ἔδυς περὶ τεύχεα χρωτί
οὔτ’ ἔφυγες δηίους οὔτε τι τραῦμ' ἔλαβες.
Athena is praised for having pleaded to Sisyphus to offer him bravoury and to protect him in battle. Sisyphus I was the son of Daochos I.

Position VIII
In position VIII the inscription goes:
Αὔξων οἰκείων προγόνων ἀρετὰς τάδε δῶρα
στῆσεμ Φοίβῳ ἄνακτι, γένος καὶ πατρίδα τιμῶν,
Δάοχος εὐδόξῳ χρώμενος εὐλογία,
Τέτραρχος Θεσσαλῶν,
ἱερομνήμων Ἀμφικτυόνων.
According to the inscription, the dedicator Daochos II, Tetrarch of the Thessalians and hieromnemon dedicates these statues to Apollo. His statue is not preserved apart from the feet (εικ.9).

Position IX
The final position IX was reserved for Daochos II' son, who apparently was too young to write something memorable for him.

Bibliography
Adam, Sh., “The technique of Greek sculpture in the archaic and classical periods”, BSA συμπλήρωμα έκδοσης τ.3 (1966)
Arnold, D., 1969 Die Polykletnachfolge, Berlin
Brown, B., 1973,Anticlassicism in Greek Sculpture of the Fourth Century B. C., New York	
Collignon, M., 1905,Lysippe, Παρίσι
Croissant, F., 1974,“Delphes, IΙ. Sculptures”, BCH 98, pp. 785–788	
Dittenberger, G., 1960,Sylloge Inscriptionurn Graecarum, τ.1, Hildesheim
Dohrn, T., 1968, “Die Marmor Standbilder des Daochos Weihgeschenks in Delphi”,Antike Plastik, v.8, 33-53
Amandry, P., Chamoux, F., 1991,Guide de Delphes, Le Musée, Παρίσι
Evans, K.E., 1996,The Daochos Monument, Michigan
Homolle, Th., 1894, “Découvertes de Delphes”, Gazette des Beaux-Arts, 3rd series, v.12, pp. 441–454
Homolle, Th., 1898,“La date de l’ex-voto des Thessaliens”, BCH 22, p. 633
Jacob-Felsch, M., 1969, Die Entwicklung griechischer Statuenbasen und die Aufstellung der Statuen, Waldsassen/Bayern
Jacquemin, A., Laroche, D., 2001, Le monument de Daochos ou le Trésor des Thessaliens, BCH 125, 2001, pp. 305–332
Johnson, F.P., 1968, Lysippos, New York
Marcadé, J ., 1953, Recueil des signatures de sculpteurs grecs, v.1, Paris
Pouilloux, J ., 1976, Fouilles de Delphes. (Épigraphie. Fassicule IV. Les inscriptions de la terrasse du temple et de la région nord du sanctuaire) v.3, Paris
Ridgway, B.S., “Die Thessalischer Grabreliefs-Studien zur Nordgriechischen Kunst, by Hagen Biesantz”, AJA 71 (1967) σ.99-101
Ridgway, B.S., 1990, Hellenistic Sculpture I. The styles of ca. 331-200 B. C., Bristol
Sjöqvist, E., 1996, Lysippus, Cincinnati
Stewart, A.F., 1978, “Lysippan Studies. 2. Agias and Oilpourer”, AJA 82, pp. 301–313
Thémélis, P., 1979, “Contribution à l’étude de l’ex-voto delphique de Daochos” BCH 103, pp. 507–520
Will, E., 1938, “À propos de la base des Thessaliens à Delphes”, BCH 62, pp. 289–304, table 30-32

References

External links
Perseus project

Collection of the Delphi Archaeological Museum
4th-century BC Greek sculptures